Tencent Dajia (directly translated as Tencent Master; shortened to Dajia), also known as iPress, was an opinion blog founded by Tencent on December 15, 2012. It was shut down on February 19, 2020. 

Jia Jia served as the editor-in-chief of Tencent Dajia. The blog used to bring together many Chinese liberal intellectuals.

History
On January 27, 2020, Tencent Dajia published an article titled The 50 days of Wuhan pneumonia: Chinese people are all paying the price of the death of media. After this article was published, Dajia suddenly disappeared from the Internet.

On February 19, 2020, an insider disclosed that Tencent had shut down "Dajia" at the request of the Office of the Central Cyberspace Affairs Commission.

References 

Defunct websites
Internet censorship
Internet properties established in 2012
Internet properties disestablished in 2020